The following low-power television stations broadcast on digital or analog channel 13 in the United States:

 K13AT-D in Dolores, Colorado
 K13AV-D in Gunnison, Colorado
 K13BA-D in Winthrop-Twisp, Washington
 K13BE-D in Harlowton, Montana
 K13BI-D in Entiat, Washington
 K13CP-D in Cedar City, Utah
 K13CQ-D in Rock Island, Washington
 K13DU-D in Whitewater, Montana
 K13ER-D in Cashmere, Washington
 K13FP-D in Wolf Point, Montana
 K13GP-D in Malta, Montana
 K13HA-D in Mink Creek, Idaho
 K13HM-D in Myrtle Creek, Oregon
 K13HU-D in Fort Jones, etc., California
 K13IB-D in Glasgow, Montana
 K13IG-D in Sidney - Fairview, Montana
 K13IY-D in Leavenworth, Washington
 K13JD-D in Battle Mountain, Nevada
 K13JO-D in Hinsdale, Montana
 K13KH-D in Townsend, Montana
 K13KP-D in Boulder, Montana
 K13KU-D in Delta Junction, Alaska
 K13KV-D in Troy, Montana
 K13LN-D in Ekalaka, Montana
 K13LU-D in Ursine, Nevada
 K13LV-D in Caliente, Nevada
 K13MA-D in Scobey, Montana
 K13MI-D in Squaw Valley, etc., Oregon
 K13ML-D in Hotchkiss, etc., Colorado
 K13NQ-D in Ruth, Nevada
 K13NR-D in Ely & McGill, Nevada
 K13NZ-D in Shoshoni, Wyoming
 K13OC-D in Douglas, etc., Alaska
 K13OG-D in Rural Juab, etc., Utah
 K13OQ-D in Big Sandy, Montana
 K13OU-D in Chinook, Montana
 K13OW-D in Baker, Montana
 K13PE-D in Shady Grove, Oregon
 K13PF-D in Pinehurst, Oregon
 K13PI-D in Ruch & Applegate, Oregon
 K13PJ-D in Vallecito, Colorado
 K13PO-D in Hysham, Montana
 K13PU-D in Pioche, Nevada
 K13PZ-D in Poplar, Montana
 K13QE-D in Driggs, Idaho
 K13QH-D in Swan Valley/Irwin, Idaho
 K13QK-D in Virgin, Utah
 K13QY-D in Dingle, etc., Idaho
 K13RD-D in Collbran, Colorado
 K13RK-D in Roswell, New Mexico
 K13RN-D in Old Harbor, Alaska
 K13RR-D in Tok, Alaska
 K13RV-D in Leadore, Idaho
 K13SA-D in Port Heiden, Alaska
 K13SD in Cape Pole, Alaska
 K13SE-D in Stony River, Alaska
 K13SM-D in Slana, Alaska
 K13SN-D in Nucla, Colorado
 K13SV-D in Pedro Bay, Alaska
 K13SY-D in Birch Creek, Alaska
 K13TD-D in White Mountain, Alaska
 K13TE-D in Bettles, Alaska
 K13TJ-D in Mountain Village, Alaska
 K13TN-D in Manley Hot Springs, Alaska
 K13TR-D in Homer, Alaska
 K13UF-D in Rexburg, Idaho
 K13UL-D in Hillsboro, New Mexico
 K13UO-D in Cold Bay, Alaska
 K13UV-D in Napakiak, Alaska
 K13WT-D in Plevna, Montana
 K13XG-D in Ismay Canyon, Colorado
 K13XH-D in Weber Canyon, Colorado
 K13XW-D in Akron, Colorado
 K13XX-D in Hesperus, Colorado
 K13ZI-D in Colorado Springs, Colorado
 K13ZL-D in Fresno, California
 K13ZN-D in Heron, Montana
 K13ZQ-D in Lubbock, Texas
 K13ZS-D in Sargents, Colorado
 K13AAE-D in Healy, Alaska
 K13AAI-D in Marysvale, Utah
 K13AAJ-D in Woodland & Kamas, Utah
 K13AAL-D in Beaver etc., Utah
 K13AAM-D in Garrison, etc., Utah
 K13AAN-D in Roosevelt, Utah
 K13AAO-D in Helper, Utah
 K13AAP-D in East Price, Utah
 K13AAQ-D in Prineville, etc., Oregon
 K13AAX-D in Redding, California
 K21FL-D in Salina & Redmond, Utah
 K42IW-D in Long Valley Junction, Utah
 K48BK-D in Monticello/Blanding, Utah
 KDPH-LD in Phoenix, Arizona
 KHTM-LD in Lufkin, Texas
 KJDA-LD in Sherman, Texas
 KKEY-LP in Bakersfield, California
 KOLD-TV in Tucson, Arizona
 KQVE-LD in San Antonio, Texas
 KUTA-LD in Ogden, Utah
 KXDF-CD in Fairbanks, Alaska
 KXHG-LD in Sunnyside, Washington
 KXXW-LD in Tyler, Texas
 KYLX-LD in Laredo, Texas
 W13DI-D in Yauco, etc., Puerto Rico
 W13DP-D in Youngstown, Ohio
 W13DQ-D in Atlanta, Georgia
 W13DS-D in Cleveland, Ohio
 W13DV-D in Crozet, Virginia
 WBFL-CA in Valdosta, Georgia
 WDSS-LD in Syracuse, New York, uses WNYI's full-power spectrum
 WIVX-LD in Akron, Ohio
 WKOB-LD in New York, New York
 WMEL-LD in Grenada, Mississippi
 WODN-LD in Portage, Indiana
 WVUX-LD in Fairmont, West Virginia
 WXVO-LD in Pascagoula, Mississippi

The following low-power stations, which are no longer licensed, formerly broadcast on digital or analog channel 13:
 K13AP in Kamiah, Idaho
 K13BB in Carlin, Nevada
 K13BZ in Helper, Utah
 K13CV in Beaver, etc., Utah
 K13DB in Green River, Utah
 K13DE in Wolcott, Colorado
 K13EH in Ainsworth, Nebraska
 K13EN in Orovada, Nevada
 K13EX in Bridgeport, etc., California
 K13EZ-D in Squilchuck St. Park, Washington
 K13GL in Happy Camp, etc., California
 K13HF in Vernal, etc., Utah
 K13HG in Ketchum, etc., Idaho
 K13HK in Sand Springs, Montana
 K13ID in Hopland, California
 K13IU in Eagleville, California
 K13KY in Portage Creek, Alaska
 K13LO in Yreka, etc., California
 K13MN in Washington, Iowa
 K13MZ in Usibelli, etc., Alaska
 K13NF in Ridgecrest, etc., California
 K13NT in Hatch, Utah
 K13OX in Mud Canyon, New Mexico
 K13OY in Mescalero, New Mexico
 K13PL in Glendive, Montana
 K13QQ in Skagway, Alaska
 K13QZ in Grand Valley, Colorado
 K13RM in Dot Lake, Alaska
 K13SB in Chitina, Alaska
 K13SC in Port Graham, Alaska
 K13SG in Kasaan, Alaska
 K13SH in Adak, Alaska
 K13SI in Circle, Alaska
 K13SK in Quinhagak, Alaska
 K13SZ in Coffman Cove, Alaska
 K13TA in Wiseman, Alaska
 K13TC in Tuntutuliak, Alaska
 K13TK in Minto, Alaska
 K13TO in New Stuyahok, Alaska
 K13TQ in Koyukuk, Alaska
 K13TS in Naukati Bay, Alaska
 K13TT in Hobart Bay, Alaska
 K13TU in Port Alsworth, Alaska
 K13TV in Port Protection, Alaska
 K13UB in Glennallen & Copper, Alaska
 K13UE in Kotzebue, Alaska
 K13UG in Nome, Alaska
 K13UJ in Platinum, Alaska
 K13UK-D in Kwigillingok, Alaska
 K13UM in Mosquito Lake, Alaska
 K13UX in Diomede, Alaska
 K13VC in Austin, Texas
 K13VT in Samak, Utah
 K13VV in Chenega, Alaska
 K13XL in Henrieville, Utah
 K13XS in Bluff & area, Utah
 K13XU in Tulsa, Oklahoma
 K13YC in Montezuma Creek/Aneth, Utah
 K13YL in Fish Lake Resort, Utah
 K13YU in Tonopah, Nevada
 KCHY-LP in Cheyenne, Wyoming
 KDAX-LP in Amarillo, Texas
 KJEF-CA in Jennings, etc., Louisiana
 KSAD-LP in San Angelo, Texas
 KWDT-LP in Corpus Christi, Texas
 W13BB in Bergton-Criders, Virginia
 W13DU-D in Hardeeville, South Carolina
 WBXU-CA in Raleigh, North Carolina
 WBXV-CA in Louisville, Kentucky
 WIVC-LP in Charlottesville, Virginia
 WNNY-LP in Syracuse, New York
 WSCP-LP in Bellefonte, Pennsylvania
 WUMN-LP in Minneapolis, Minnesota

References

13 low-power